Barley Sheaf was an unincorporated community located within Readington Township in Hunterdon County, New Jersey, United States. It was named for the grain once grown in the region. The hamlet was on Barley Sheaf Road between County Route 629 (CR 629) and CR 523.  The hamlet at one time housed a general store, a post office, blacksmith, creamery, a hotel and numerous farmsteads.  Today only farms remain of the hamlet. The hamlet also carried the names of Farmersville and Campbellsville after Catherine Campbell, who ran the hotel in the area.

References

Unincorporated communities in Hunterdon County, New Jersey
Unincorporated communities in Readington Township, New Jersey
Unincorporated communities in New Jersey